Isaiah Edwin Leopold (November 9, 1886 – June 19, 1966), better known as Ed Wynn, was an American actor and comedian. He was noted for his Perfect Fool comedy character, his pioneering radio show of the 1930s, and his later career as a dramatic actor.

Background
Wynn was born Isaiah Edwin Leopold in Philadelphia, Pennsylvania, to a Jewish family. His father, Joseph, a milliner, was born in Bohemia. His mother, Minnie Greenberg, of Romanian and Turkish ancestry, came from Istanbul. Wynn attended Central High School in Philadelphia until age 15. He ran away from home in his teens, worked as a hat salesman and as a utility boy, and eventually adapted his middle name "Edwin" into his new stage name, "Ed Wynn", to save his family the embarrassment of having a lowly comedian as a relative.

Career

Wynn began his career in vaudeville in 1903 and was a star of the Ziegfeld Follies starting in 1914. During The Follies of 1915, W. C. Fields allegedly caught Wynn mugging for the audience under the table during Fields's Pool Room routine and knocked Wynn unconscious with his cue.  Wynn wrote, directed, and produced many Broadway shows in the subsequent decades, and was known for his silly costumes and props as well as for the giggly, wavering voice he developed for the 1921 musical revue The Perfect Fool. Wynn became a very active member of The Lambs Club in 1919.

Radio

In the early 1930s, Wynn hosted the popular radio show The Fire Chief, heard in North America on Tuesday nights, sponsored by Texaco gasoline. Like many former vaudeville performers who turned to radio in the same decade, the stage-trained Wynn insisted on playing for a live studio audience, doing each program as an actual stage show, using visual bits to augment his written material, and in his case, wearing a colorful costume with a red fireman's helmet. He usually bounced his gags off announcer/straight man Graham McNamee; Wynn's customary opening, "Tonight, Graham, the show's gonna be different," became one of the most familiar tag-lines of its time; a sample joke: "Graham, my uncle just bought a new second-handed car... he calls it Baby! I don't know, it won't go anyplace without a rattle!"

Wynn reprised his Fire Chief radio character in two films, Follow the Leader (1930) and The Chief (1933). Near the height of his radio fame (1933) he founded his own short-lived radio network the Amalgamated Broadcasting System, which lasted only five weeks, nearly destroying the comedian. According to radio historian Elizabeth McLeod, the failed venture left Wynn deep in debt, divorced and finally, suffering a nervous breakdown.

Wynn was offered the title role The Wizard in MGM's 1939 screen adaptation of The Wizard of Oz, but turned it down, as did his Ziegfeld contemporary W. C. Fields. The part went to Frank Morgan.

Television

Ed Wynn first appeared on television on July 7, 1936, in a brief, ad-libbed spot with Graham McNamee during an NBC experimental television broadcast. In the 1949–50 season, Wynn hosted The Ed Wynn Show, one of the first network, comedy-variety television shows, on CBS, and won both a Peabody Award and an Emmy Award in 1949. Buster Keaton, Carmen Miranda, Lucille Ball, Desi Arnaz, Hattie McDaniel and The Three Stooges all made guest appearances with Wynn.  This was the first CBS variety television show to originate from Los Angeles, which was seen live on the West Coast, but filmed via kinescope for distribution in the Midwestern United States and the Eastern United States, as the national coaxial cable had yet to be completed. Wynn was also a rotating host of NBC's Four Star Revue from 1950 through 1952.

After the end of Wynn's third television series, The Ed Wynn Show (a short-lived situation comedy on NBC's 1958–59 schedule), his son, actor Keenan Wynn, encouraged him to make a career change rather than retire. The comedian reluctantly began a career as a dramatic actor in television and films. Father and son appeared in three productions, the first of which was the 1956 Playhouse 90 broadcast of Rod Serling's play Requiem for a Heavyweight. Ed was terrified of straight acting, and kept goofing his lines in rehearsal. When the producers wanted to fire him, star Jack Palance said he would quit if they fired Ed. (However, unbeknownst to Wynn, supporting player Ned Glass was his secret understudy in case something did happen before air time.) On live broadcast night, Wynn surprised everyone with his pitch-perfect performance, and his quick ad libs to cover his mistakes. A dramatization of what happened during the production was later staged as an April 1960 Westinghouse Desilu Playhouse episode, The Man in the Funny Suit, starring both senior and junior Wynns, with key figures involved in the original production also portraying themselves (including Rod Serling and director Ralph Nelson). Ed and his son also worked together in the Jose Ferrer film The Great Man, with Ed again proving his unexpected skills in drama.

Requiem established Wynn as a serious dramatic actor who could easily hold his own with the best. His performance in The Diary of Anne Frank (1959) received an Academy Award nomination for Best Supporting Actor.

Also in 1959, Wynn appeared on Serling's TV series The Twilight Zone in  "One for the Angels". Serling, a longtime admirer, had written that episode especially for him, and Wynn later in 1963 starred in the episode "Ninety Years Without Slumbering". For the rest of his life, Wynn skillfully moved between comic and dramatic roles. He appeared in feature films and anthology television, endearing himself to new generations of fans.

Cartoons
Wynn was caricatured in the Merrie Melodies cartoon shorts Shuffle Off to Buffalo (1933), I've Got to Sing a Torch Song (1933), and as a pot of jam in the Betty Boop short Betty in Blunderland (1934).

Films

He appeared as the Fairy Godfather in Jerry Lewis's Cinderfella. His performance as Paul Beaseley in the 1958 film The Great Man earned him nominations for a Golden Globe Award for "Best Supporting Actor" and a BAFTA Award for "Best Foreign Actor". The following year he received his first (and only) nomination for an Academy Award for Best Supporting Actor for his role as Mr. Dussell in The Diary of Anne Frank (1959). Six years later he appeared in the Bible epic The Greatest Story Ever Told.

Disney
Wynn provided the voice of the Mad Hatter in Walt Disney's film Alice in Wonderland (1951) and played The Toymaker alongside Annette Funicello and Tommy Sands in the Christmas operetta film Babes in Toyland released in 1961.

In Walt Disney's Mary Poppins (1964), he played eccentric Uncle Albert floating around just beneath the ceiling in uncontrollable mirth, singing "I Love to Laugh".

Re-teaming with the Disney team the following year—in That Darn Cat! (1965), featuring Dean Jones and Hayley Mills—Wynn filled out the character of Mr. Hofstedder, the watch jeweler with his bumbling charm. He also had brief roles in The Absent Minded Professor (as the fire chief, in a scene alongside his son Keenan Wynn, who played the film's antagonist) and Son of Flubber (as county agricultural agent A.J. Allen). His final performance, as Rufus in Walt Disney's The Gnome-Mobile, was released a few months after his death.

In addition to Disney films, Wynn was also an actor in the Disneyland production The Golden Horseshoe Revue.

Personal life
Wynn was married three times. He first married actress Hilda Keenan on September 5, 1914. They eventually divorced on May 13, 1937, after twenty-three years of marriage. Together, they had a son, actor Keenan Wynn. He married his second wife, Frieda Mierse, on June 25, 1937, but would divorce her only two years later on December 12, 1939. He married his third and final wife Dorothy Elizabeth Nesbitt on July 31, 1946. She filed for divorce from Wynn on February 1, 1955, and it was finalized on March 1, 1955.

Wynn was a Freemason at Lodge No. 9 in Pennsylvania.

Death

Wynn died on June 19, 1966, in Beverly Hills, California, of esophageal cancer, at the age of 79. He is interred at Forest Lawn Memorial Park in Glendale.

His bronze grave marker reads:

Red Skelton, who was discovered by Wynn, stated: "His death is the first time he ever made anyone sad."

Legacy
Wynn's distinctive voice continues to be emulated by countless actors and comedians. It was deliberately emulated by Alan Tudyk for character King Candy in Disney's animated film Wreck-It Ralph, by Daws Butler for the character of Wally Gator, by Paul Frees for the characters of Captain Peter "Wrongway" Peachfuzz on Rocky and Bullwinkle and Fred the lion from the Super Chicken segment of George of the Jungle, by Howard Morris for the character of Mayor McCheese in the McDonaldland ad commercials, by Cam Clarke for character Multo in The Zula Patrol, by Joey D'Auria for the character Mr. Scatterbrain on The Mr. Men Show, by Meshach Taylor for the character Cecil in The Secret of NIMH 2: Timmy to the Rescue, by Mark Hamill for the character Fergle O'Reilly in Dexter's Laboratory, by Kevin Michael Richardson for the character Uncle Pockets in Foster's Home for Imaginary Friends, by Dallas McKennon as Professor Kapp in the Gumby franchise, by Jeff Bennett for characters Choose Goose in Adventure Time and Ranger Jinx in Mixels, by Mark Silverman for the plush doll Herbie in Malcolm in the Middle, and by Walker Edmiston for the character Dr. Blinky in H.R. Pufnstuf.

Wynn was posthumously named a Disney Legend on August 10, 2013.

In the graphic adventure game King's Quest VI, the character Jollo is based on his style.

Broadway and films

The Deacon and the Lady (1910) – musical – actor/performer
Ziegfeld Follies of 1914 (1914) – revue – actor/performer
Ziegfeld Follies of 1915 (1915) – revue – actor/performer
The Passing Show of 1916 (1916) – revue – actor/performer
Sometime (1918) – play – actor
Ed Wynn's Carnival (1920) – revue – composer, lyricist, book-writer and performer/actor
The All-Star Idlers of 1921 (1921) – revue – actor/performer
The Perfect Fool (1921) – revue – composer, lyricist, book-writer, director and actor/performer
The Grab Bag (1924) – revue – producer, composer, lyricist, book-writer and actor/performer
Manhattan Mary (1927) – musical – actor in the role of "Crickets"
Rubber Heels (1927) – actor (as Homer Thrush)
Simple Simon (1930) – musical – co-book-writer and actor
Revived in 1931 (was also producer in addition to above roles)
Follow the Leader (1930) – actor (as Crickets)
The Laugh Parade (1931) – revue – producer, co-book-writer, director, originator and star actor/performer
Turn Back the Clock (1933) – actor (as Cigar Store Customer), uncredited
The Chief (1933) – actor (as Henry Summers)
Alice Takat (1936) – play – producer
Hooray for What! (1937) – musical – actor in the role of "Chuckles"
Boys and Girls Together (1940) – revue – producer, co-book-writer, originator, director and actor/performer
Morose Thoughts (1941) – revue – producer, book co-author, and actor
Laugh, Town, Laugh! (1942) – revue – producer, book-writer and director
Stage Door Canteen (1943) – himself (Ed Wynn)
Alice in Wonderland (1951) – voice actor (as Mad Hatter)
Playhouse 90 episode "Requiem for a Heavyweight" (1956) – actor (as Army)
The Great Man (1956) – actor (as Paul Beaseley)
Marjorie Morningstar (1958) – actor (as Uncle Samson)
The Diary of Anne Frank (1959) – actor (as Fritz Pfeffer)
Wagon Train episode "The Cappy Darrin Story" (1959) – actor (as Cappy Darrin)
Peabody's Improbable History episode "King Arthur" (1959) – voice actor (as Frantic Man)
The Twilight Zone episode "One for the Angels" (1959) – actor (as Lou Bookman)
Miracle on 34th Street (1959) – actor (as Kris Kringle)
Startime episode "The Greatest Man Alive" (1960) – actor (as Amos Benedict)
Cinderfella (1960) – actor (as the fairy godfather)
The Absent-Minded Professor (1961) – actor (as Fire Chief)
Babes in Toyland (1961) – actor (as The Toy Maker)
Rawhide episode "Twenty-Five Santa Clauses" (1961) – actor (as Bateman)
The Sound of Laughter (1962) – actor (as host and narrator)
Son of Flubber (1963) – actor (as Dept. of Agriculture agent)
77 Sunset Strip episode "5: Part 1" (1963) – actor (as Feigenstein)
The Twilight Zone episode "Ninety Years Without Slumbering" (1963) – actor (as Sam Forstmann)
Burke's Law episode "Who Killed Avery Lord?" (1964) – actor (as Zachary Belden)
For the Love of Willadean (1964) – actor (as Alfred) 
The Patsy (1964) – actor (as Ed Wynn)
Mary Poppins (1964) – actor (as Uncle Albert)
Slattery's People episode "Question: What Ever Happened to Ezra?" (1964) – actor (as Ezra Tallicott)
Dear Brigitte (1965) – actor (as The Captain and Narrator)
Those Calloways (1965) – actor (as Ed Parker)
Bonanza episode "The Ponderosa Birdman" (1965) – actor (as Professor Phineas T. Klump)
The Greatest Story Ever Told (1965) – actor (as Old Aram)
That Darn Cat! (1965) – actor (as Mr. Hofstedder)
The Daydreamer (1966) – voice actor (as The Emperor)
Combat! episode "The Flying Machine" (1966) – actor (as Lt. Brannigan)
Vacation Playhouse episode "You're Only Young Twice" (1967) – actor (as Professor Hubert Abernathy)
The Gnome-Mobile (1967) – actor (as Rufus) – released after his death (final film role)

Awards and nominations

See also

List of actors with Academy Award nominations

References

External links

 
 
The Ed Wynn Show at Classic TV Info.
Four Star Revue/All Star Revue at Classic TV Info.
Biography of Ed Wynn  at Ed-Wynn.info
Ed Wynn papers at the Free Library of Philadelphia Theatre Collection
Radio Journeys: Texaco Fire Chief (July 26, 1932)

1886 births
1966 deaths
20th-century American comedians
20th-century American male actors
American Freemasons
American male comedy actors
American male film actors
American male radio actors
American male musical theatre actors
American male stage actors
American male television actors
American male voice actors
American people of Romanian-Jewish descent
American people of Czech-Jewish descent
American people of Ottoman-Jewish descent
American radio personalities
Burials at Forest Lawn Memorial Park (Glendale)
Central High School (Philadelphia) alumni
Deaths from cancer in California
Deaths from esophageal cancer
Disney people
Jewish American male actors
Male actors from Philadelphia
Vaudeville performers
Ziegfeld Follies
Members of The Lambs Club